Abdullah Bukhari (1922–2009) was the 12th Shahi Imam of the Jama Masjid, Delhi.

Early life and career
He was born in Rajasthan and completed his Senior Cambridge from New Delhi and was appointed Naib-Shahi Imam in 1946. He was appointed to the office of the Shahi Imam on Sunday, 8 July 1973 AD after the Eleventh Shahi Imam Maulana Syed Hameed Bukhari.

Association with politics
India's Prime minister Morarji Desai offered to him the position of Vice President of India after he won the 1977 elections defeating Indira Gandhi. "He was one of the strong voices that opposed the Emergency in 1975. He protested against the targeting of Muslims when they were asked to undergo 'nasbandi' (vasectomy)."

Death
Syed Abdullah Bukhari was hospitalized with breathing difficulties, as well as heart and kidney issues, on 9 June 2009. He died a month later, on 8 July, of a heart attack and was buried the same day in the family burial ground in the Walled city of Delhi. He was survived by four sons and two daughters. His son, Ahmed Bukhari, is the current Shahi Imam of the Jama Masjid.

The Hindu said "He is believed to have risked his life to rescue Muslims from rioters following Partition and made arrangements for their relief and rehabilitation. He also encouraged them to remain in the country."

References

1922 births
2009 deaths
20th-century imams
Indian Quran reciters
Indian imams
21st-century imams
Indian Islamic religious leaders